was a town located in Kishima District, Saga Prefecture, Japan.

On January 1, 2005, Fukudomi, along with the town of Ariake (also from Kishima District), was merged into the expanded town of Shiroishi.

Dissolved municipalities of Saga Prefecture